A Family Thing is a 1996 American drama film starring Robert Duvall, James Earl Jones and Irma P. Hall. It was rewritten by Billy Bob Thornton and Tom Epperson, the original script, "Latent Blood" was written by L Guy Burton, and directed by Richard Pearce.

Plot

Earl Pilcher (Robert Duvall), owner of an equipment rental company in a small town in Arkansas, receives a shocking letter from his mother upon her death. She reveals that Earl's biological mother was actually an African-American maid named Willa Mae, who was raped by Earl's (white) father and that she died while giving birth to Earl. His adoptive mother's dying wish is that he go to Chicago to meet his half-brother, Raymond Murdock (James Earl Jones). Earl initially takes the unexpected news of his mixed race parentage badly, challenging his father to confirm the facts in the letter. Old and feeble, his father refuses to discuss the letter, but admits it is true. As a result, Earl packs up his clothes and takes off for Chicago to find his brother.

He meets Ray at city hall where Ray works as a police officer. Ray agrees to meet with him for lunch at a local diner, although he really wants nothing to do with Earl. During lunch, Ray reveals that he knew all along that he had a half white brother and that he hates Earl's father (and Earl too by association) because he feels Earl's birth is what killed his mother. He says he wants nothing to do with Earl or their biological father, and they go their separate ways.  Later, that day, he's hospitalized after being beaten up and carjacked by four black street toughs while still in the city. The hospital staff finds Ray's information in Earl's pocket and calls Ray. He comes reluctantly, and the doctor tells him that Earl may have a concussion and needs to take it easy for a couple of days; no traveling is allowed. She also tells him that the hospital is full, so he will have to take Earl home to recuperate.

At Ray's home, Earl meets Ray's Aunt T (Irma P. Hall), a kind and generous elderly woman who is blind. Aunt T. is Willa Mae's sister, and therefore, Earl's maternal aunt. Earl also meets Ray's son, Virgil (Michael Beach), a surly and hostile city bus driver who doesn't appreciate a white southerner sleeping in his bed. At first, Earl's stay at the Murdoch residence is rocky. Ray explains that Earl is an old war buddy whose life he saved, but Virgil is skeptical.  During a grocery shopping excursion with Earl, Aunt T reveals that she knows who Earl really is. In a powerful scene, Aunt T scolds Ray and Virgil for not welcoming a member of their family, no matter how different he is. Earl overhears the discussion and leaves Ray's house, walking unknowingly into a bad part of town.

Ray gives in to Aunt T's wish that he welcome Earl into their home, and he quickly locates him on a nearby street. Earl obstinately refuses to come back with Ray, knowing he is not wanted. The two argue, ending up in an awkward wrestling match, and Earl uses the word "nigger" to punctuate his disdain for Ray, seeing too late that he has gone too far. Angry at Earl's callous words, Ray tells Earl to stay away from him, and he heads back home.

Meanwhile, Earl wanders Chicago and gets drunk at a Chicago bar, where he is tossed out for bothering a black couple. He ends up sleeping under a bridge. The next day, Ray has cooled down and, again on Aunt T.'s wishes, manages to find Earl, who apologizes for his words and rude behavior. The two begin to settle their differences. When Virgil's estranged wife (played by Regina Taylor) and their two daughters visit, Earl learns that Virgil had a promising career in football that was shattered by an injury in college. Virgil cannot cope with the missed opportunities caused by his injury, and, the resulting bitterness has hurt his relationship with his family.

Ray and Earl bond together more as they find similarities between them. Both served in the military (Earl as a firefighter in the United States Navy, and Ray in the U.S. Marines) during the Korean War, where they received lifelong scars. Ray reveals that as a child, he once threw a rock at Earl that could have blinded him, because of Ray's hatred towards Earl's father. Later on, in a bar, Earl takes Virgil aside and explains to him that by dwelling on the loss of his football career, he isn't devoting himself to his wife and children in the way he should. Both of them begin to have a grudging respect for the other.

Once Earl is ready to go home, and the police unexpectedly find his truck operational (it was shot up in a bank robbery), Aunt T. sits Earl and Ray down to tell them the dramatic tale of the night Earl was born and Willa Mae died. According to Aunt T., Willa Mae knew she was likely to die and Earl's life was saved only by the quick action of his adoptive mother, Carrie, who brought a white doctor to the shack where Willa Mae and Ray lived to help with the delivery.

Aunt T speculates that Carrie and Willa Mae agreed that Earl, who was born with white-appearing features, should be raised by Carrie and his biological father. Aunt T. gives Earl a picture of Willa Mae which he keeps near. Earl begins to accept his new family with pride, and he convinces Ray to return to their Arkansas hometown to find their mother's grave. As they share a drink, standing over her grave marker, Earl decides to take Ray to meet his southern family and tell them the unlikely story, ending the movie by joking with Ray that when Earl's white nephew finds out he is part black, he will likely want to fight the both of them.

Cast
Robert Duvall as Earl Pilcher, Jr.
James Earl Jones as Raymond “Ray” Lee Murdoch
Irma P. Hall as Aunt T.
Michael Beach as Virgil Murdoch
David Keith as Sonny Pilcher
Regina Taylor as Ann Murdoch
Grace Zabriskie as Ruby Pilcher
Paula Marshall as Karen

Reception

The movie received a positive reception. It holds a 73% "Fresh" rating at Rotten Tomatoes, based on 22 reviews.

References

External links

1996 films
1996 drama films
Films about adoption
Films shot in Chicago
Films shot in Tennessee
Films about race and ethnicity
Films directed by Richard Pearce
Films set in Chicago
Films set in Arkansas
United Artists films
African-American drama films
1990s English-language films
1990s American films